Redwan Ahmed is a Bangladesh Liberal Democratic Party politician and a former state minister of liberation war affairs. He is a 4-term Jatiya Sangsad member representing the Comilla-6 and Comilla-10 constituencies.

Career
Ahmed was first elected to parliament from Comilla-6 Chandina Upazila under the first Ziaur Rahman government as a candidate of Bangladesh Nationalist Party. 1979.  Subsequently, he was also elected in 1986, 1991 and 2001.  He served as the State Minister for Jute and Textile in 1995 and again as State Minister for Liberation War affairs in the Second Khaleda Cabinet.

Ahmed left Bangladesh Nationalist Party in 2006 and joined the Liberal Democratic Party. He is a presidium member and general secretary of the party.

As a businessman, Ahmed served as the president of Bangladesh Garment Manufacturers and Exporters Association from 1993 to 1996.  One of his notable works was signing the MOU with UNICEF and International Labour Organization for the elimination of child labour and its successful implementation.

Personal life
Ahmed is married to Momtaz Ahmed. As a philanthropist, Ahmed established Chandina Redwan Ahmed University College.

References

Living people
People from Comilla District
Bangladesh Nationalist Party politicians
State Ministers of Liberation War Affairs
2nd Jatiya Sangsad members
3rd Jatiya Sangsad members
5th Jatiya Sangsad members
8th Jatiya Sangsad members
Year of birth missing (living people)